Christos Zachopoulos is the former general-secretary of the Ministry of Culture in Greece. 

In December 2007, Zachopoulos made a suicide attempt after being forced to resign as a result of an alleged affair with a female archaeologist on his staff. The woman was charged with complicity in the attempted suicide.

References

Greek politicians
Living people
Year of birth missing (living people)
Politicians from Thessaloniki